Tierra del Pan (Land of Bread) is a comarca located in the center of the province of Zamora, western Spain. It belongs to the Autonomous Community of Castile and  León. The city of Zamora, capital of the province, is included in this comarca.

Despite the strong identity of its inhabitants, this historical region has not been able to achieve the necessary legal recognition for its administrative development. Therefore its municipalities have resorted to organizing themselves in mancomunidad, the only legal formula that has allowed the region to manage its public municipal resources meaningfully. The comarca has a total of about 76,000 inhabitants.

The Tierra del Pan comarca has a surface of 849.59 km². Its geography is typical of the Meseta Central.

Municipalities
 Algodre
 Almaraz de Duero 
 Andavías 
 Arquillinos 
 Benegiles 
 Cerecinos del Carrizal
 Coreses
 Cubillos
 La Hiniesta 
 Manganeses de la Lampreana
Riego del Camino
 Matilla la Seca 
 Molacillos
 Monfarracinos
 Montamarta
 Moreruela de los Infanzones
 Muelas del Pan
Cerezal de Aliste
Ricobayo

 Pajares de la Lampreana
 Palacios del Pan
 Piedrahita de Castro
 Roales del Pan
 San Cebrián de Castro
Fontanillas de Castro
 San Pedro de la Nave-Almendra
El Campillo
Valdeperdices
 Torres del Carrizal 
 Valcabado
 Villaseco del Pan
 Zamora

References

External links

 Información y fotos de la comarca Tierra del Pan

Comarcas of the Province of Zamora